Live at the China Club is a live album by the alternative rock group Dramarama, released in 1990.

Track listing
 "Anything, Anything (I'll Give You)"
 "Last Cigarette"
 "Some Crazy Dame"
 "Spare Change"
 "Private World"
 "Would You Like"

Personnel
 Mr E. Boy - Electric Lead Guitar, Feedback
 Pete Wood - Electric Rhythm Guitar
 Jesse - Drum Kit
 Chris Carter - Bass
 John Easdale - Voice, Acoustic Guitar
With:
 Tom Mullaney - Keyboard, Bar Stool

References 

Dramarama albums
1990 live albums
Albums produced by Val Garay